Łazówek  is a village in the administrative district of Gmina Sterdyń, within Sokołów County, Masovian Voivodeship, in  Poland.

The village has a population of 210.

References

Villages in Sokołów County